The 3M Open is a professional golf tournament in Minnesota on the PGA Tour, held at TPC Twin Cities in Blaine, a suburb north of Minneapolis. Announced by the PGA Tour in June 2018, the tournament debuted in 2019 on  Minnesota-based company 3M is the title sponsor of the event.

It succeeded the 3M Championship, a PGA Tour Champions event for 26 years (1993–2018), held at

Winners

References

External links

Coverage on the PGA Tour's official site
TPC Twin Cities

PGA Tour events
Golf in Minnesota
Sports in Blaine, Minnesota
2019 establishments in Minnesota
Recurring sporting events established in 2019